Badminton at the 2021 Summer Deaflympics  was held in Caxias Do Sul, Brazil from 2 to 11 May 2022.

Medal summary

Medalists

Results

References

External links 
 Deaflympics 2021

2021 Summer Deaflympics
Deaflympics
Badminton tournaments in Brazil